Kapurpur is a small village in the Jaunpur district of the Indian state of Uttar Pradesh. It is under the local administration of Kapurpur Panchayath in the Varanasi division.

Kapurpur's pin code is 222141.

See also 
Jaunpur (Lok Sabha constituency)
Malhani (Assembly constituency)
Khunshapur

References 
http://www.brandbharat.com/english/up/districts/Jaunpur/JAUNPUR_BAKSHA_GAURA%20KHURD_KAPURPUR.html
https://schools.org.in/jaunpur/09640605601/p-s-kapurpur.html

https://onlineindiacode.com/UTTAR-PRADESH/jaunpur/jaunpur/kapurpur

https://www.icbse.com/pincodes/222141
Villages in Jaunpur district